John Murphy McMillan Jr. (born July 6, 1941) is an American politician who served as the 40th Treasurer of Alabama. He was elected as a Republican in November 2010 to the office of Alabama Commissioner of Agriculture and Industries.  He was elected to a second four-year term in 2014. In 2018, McMillan won the Republican primary election for State Treasurer, and had no Democratic opposition on the general election ballot.

Political career
McMillan served as a Baldwin County Commissioner and as an Alabama state representative (elected in 1974 and 1978) representing Baldwin and Mobile counties as a Democrat. While in the Alabama state legislature McMillan chaired the Agriculture, Forestry and Natural Resources Committee and was selected twice as the Alabama Wildlife Federation's "Conservation Legislator of the Year." Recently McMillan founded the Alabama Sportsmen's Caucus to serve as an advocate group for the outdoors business industry and for the rights of hunters, gun owners, and fishermen.

McMillan served as the Alabama State Commissioner of Conservation and Natural Resources in the first administration of Gov. Fob James (1980–1983).  As Commissioner, McMillan won widespread praise for his part in the creation of the Alabama Trust Fund (originally called the Alabama Heritage Trust Fund), a plan to save the receipts from leases of offshore oil operations.  This fund has grown from the original investment of just over $400 million to a sum approaching $4 billion. Additionally, McMillan spearheaded the rebuilding of Gulf State Park after the widespread destruction of Hurricane Frederic.

McMillan is the former chief executive (1985–2006) of the Alabama Forestry Association where he was a leader in the successful fight to defeat the Amendment One Tax Increase of 2003. As the head of this powerful statewide association, McMillan became known as an advocate for the rights of property owners and a consistent opponent of property tax increases.

McMillan was named to the Alabama State Personnel Board by Governor Fob James during the 1990s and reappointed to a second term by Governor Bob Riley. On the State Personnel Board McMillan has played a leading role in investigating alleged "kickbacks" to state employee union bosses.

On November 2, 2010, McMillan defeated Democrat Glen Zorn for the post of Alabama Commissioner of Agriculture and Industries. McMillan received 862,901 votes to Zorn's 583,255.

In June 2018, McMillan won Alabama's Republican primary election for the office of State Treasurer, besting two challengers. No Democrats qualified for the primary ballot, practically guaranteeing McMillan's victory in November's general election.

Education and personal life
John McMillan is a native of rural Stockton, Alabama, where he worked as a boy (and as a young man after returning from college ) on his uncle's farm and in his father's sawmill. McMillan is a graduate of Rhodes College in Memphis. McMillan and his wife Kathryn have two grown sons, Murphy and William, and two grandchildren. McMillan is an avid outdoorsman who won the Governor's One-Shot Turkey Hunt in 2006. He is known as a dedicated hunter of deer, wild turkey, and other Alabama game, and also enjoys fishing with his family. His twin brother Steve McMillan died in April 2022.

Electoral history

References

External links
 

|-

1941 births
Alabama Commissioners of Agriculture and Industries
American hunters
County commissioners in Alabama
Living people
Democratic Party members of the Alabama House of Representatives
People from Bay Minette, Alabama
Rhodes College alumni
State treasurers of Alabama
American twins